Gunfire is a fictional DC Comics superhero and freelance anti-terrorist operative. He first appeared in Deathstroke Annual #2 (October 1993), created by Len Wein and Steve Erwin and was one of the "New Bloods", several superpowered individuals introduced during the 1993 DC Comics Bloodlines crossover event.

Fictional character biography
During the Bloodlines crossover, Venev, one of the alien parasites, emerges in Paris and senses power nearby in the form of Deathstroke the Terminator. She follows him to the Van Horn company building, and on the way attacks and slays the owner of the company. Andrew Van Horn, the man's son, is also attacked and seemingly killed. Venev notes how he has a "familiar taste".

Andrew soon awakens and, realizing that a creature is inside the building slaughtering his employees, creates a suit of technological armor and follows the trail of bodies. He encounters Deathstroke whom he attacks, thinking him responsible for the carnage, although both men fail to hurt each other due to their body armor. In the course of the battle, Andrew discovers his blasting powers and attempts to use them on Deathstroke. Both men soon come to an understanding and head off to battle Venev.

New Bloods

Soon after this incident, Andrew's connection with the aliens draws him to Metropolis, where veteran superheroes are battling the creature that the parasites have brought forth. Andrew works with dozens of other 'New Bloods', people who have acquired powers when attacked. Eventually, the superheroes are freed and the aliens destroyed.

As Andrew Van Horn takes over his family company, he quickly learns his father had profited from weapons sales to terrorists, whom he starts working to neutralize, which leads him into conflict with 'Dominion', a former employee of his father's business. Dominion runs a group called the 'Oblivion Front' but Gunfire soon ends its operation.

Gunfire was seen as one of the many prisoners in stasis tubes after the Ultra-Humanite, using the magic of Johnny Thunder's Thunderbolt, conquers the world.

Infinite Crisis

During the Infinite Crisis, the Secret Society of Supervillains gathers an army to march on Metropolis. Gunfire is amongst the army of heroes gathered by the information broker Oracle. A massive battle ensues, with fatalities on both sides.

Some time later, while fighting alongside fellow Blood Pack colleagues Hook, Anima and Argus, his hands are cut off by the supervillain Prometheus. Anima and Hook do not survive the battle.

Final Crisis
Gunfire is seen with dozens of other forgotten heroes, such as Ace the Bat-Hound and fellow Bloodlines Geist. They are all stuck in a self-described 'Limbo', where no stories happen. They are rescued by Superman and a dimension crossing ship. Later, all of them assist against the cosmic threat of Mandrakk.

Heroes in Crisis
During the Heroes in Crisis storyline, Gunfire checked into Sanctuary to deal with the distress of his vigilante activity. He is among the heroes who are killed in an unexpected attack.

Other versions

DC One Million

Gunfire's eyepiece survived into the far, far future, appearing in Hitman One Million. This grants a citizen of the future Gunfire's exact powers simply because it is so old and was used by a super-powered hero. The man utilizing the eyepiece was not very competent. Hitman first blows out his knee, then while effecting first aid; turns his medical pack into a gun, injuring himself further. Finally, the legacy turns his own buttocks into a grenade by accident. He perishes moments later.

John McCrea, who illustrated that issue, describes Gunfire as "one of the junk-er characters to come out of Bloodlines", stating that he "told Garth [Ennis] many, many times that [McCrea] hated Gunfire, because it's a terrible, terrible concept".

Bloodlines (2011)
In The New 52 remake of the titular Bloodlines event, a similar albeit different character came under the infection of a microbial alien parasite which gave him similar powers yet were of a different nature. 

A local beat cop in the isolated town of Pine Ridge by the name of Blake is currently in a strained relationship with fellow townee and resident auto mechanic Haley. Much like his love interest, the good officer becomes infected with the foreign entity from outer space and gains the ability to transmogrify anything he touches into a volatile explosive energy state and back. He and a couple of other Pine Ridge occupants are drawn together by a mysterious stranger who knows of the terror surrounding their current happenstances as he'd lost his entire family to the same affliction that's been going around and turning the suburb's citizens into superpowered zombies.

At the height of the mini-series, Blake succumbs to the infection just as he and the others breach into the hive of the mother parasite. Haley is forced to kill him by ripping out his own extraterrestrial leech with her power.

Powers and abilities
 Gunfire is able to turn anything he touches into a gun, doing so by agitating atoms within an object in order to discharge its molecular mass as concussive energy bullets. Once its mass has been spent, the item can no longer maintain structural integrity, crumbling to ashes scant moments afterward. Inorganic objects last longer than biological ones and the denser or larger objects contribute more bullets or greater energy discharge upon release.
 If Gunfire attempts to use an object without a defined topological focal point (i.e. perfect sphere like a snowglobe), it would become a timed explosive, like a hand grenade.
 On at least one occasion Gunfire was able to release a concussive force blast without using an object. He was able to agitate atoms in the air in front of his hands and released a powerful enough energy blast that sent his father flying through a wall. This would seem to indicate that his abilities also function on non-solid materials, since air itself has no defined focal point.
 Gunfire's ability to convert matter to energy is similar to an ability possessed by Russian superhero Pozhar.
 He can also use himself as a transferal conduit to channel another item's energized mass through. The greatest extent of which shown thus far included sticking one hand in hot lava to bleed off its mass into successive concussive blasts by channeling it through the other. All in order to render the molten rock inert and prevent a massive eruption.

DCnU
 Officer Blake's parasite derived abilities enable him to turn most anything he touches into a volatile material energy state. Once effectively transmorphed, most objects he uses his power on can be converted into raw destructive force. He can either dial the energy back or let it run its course wherein said alternated element explodes with varying degrees of blast power.
 Blake's talent is not limited to tactile interaction, for he can use it on anything he makes eye contact with, having melted bullets mid-flight before they could reach him and/or energize open air for makeshift energy blasts. 
 The parasite within him also magnifies physical prowess once it fully takes hold of the subject. Under its thrall, Blake became strong enough to lift a mid-sized boulder over his head using nothing but his bare hands. It also has a better grasp on the powers bestowed than its host, the puppeteer entity could selectively convert parts of an object into energy to strengthen them, such as converting the bullets in a gun or charging a nightstick.

References

External links
DCU Guide: Gunfire

Comics characters introduced in 1993
Characters created by Len Wein
DC Comics metahumans
DC Comics superheroes
DC Comics titles